Ebbsfleet and Cliffsend Halt railway station served the hamlet of Ebbsfleet, Thanet, Kent, England from 1908 to 1933 on the Kent Coast Line.

History 
The station opened on 7 May 1908 by the South Eastern and Chatham Railway. It closed to both passengers and goods traffic on 1 April 1933.
The new Thanet Parkway station has been built about 100 metres west of the site of the station.

References

External links 

Disused railway stations in Kent
Former South Eastern Railway (UK) stations
Railway stations in Great Britain opened in 1908
Railway stations in Great Britain closed in 1933
1908 establishments in England
1933 disestablishments in England